Capul Island Lighthouse is a lighthouse on Titoog Point in San Luis on the northern tip of Capul Island, Northern Samar in the Philippines.  It marks the western entrance to the San Bernardino Strait coming in from Ticao Pass.

The design of the lighthouse started in 1892 under Guillermo Brockman. He designed a cylindrical lighthouse with a pavilion and machinery. Construction on the lighthouse was started in October 1893 under Francisco Perez Muñoz and it was first lit in December 1896 while the station was still partially complete.  Work was suspended a month before in November 1896 on the onset of the Philippine Revolution. The pavilion was finished during the American era.

The Capul Island Lighthouse together with the Batag Island Lighthouse were declared provincial historical landmarks by the province of Northern Samar in October 2008.

Marker from the National Historical Commission of the Philippines 
The lighthouse was declared as a National Historical Landmark on September 9, 2013. The marker entitled Parola ng Capul was installed on October 24, 2018. It was installed by the National Historical Commission of the Philippines.

See also 

 List of lighthouses in the Philippines

References

External links 

 
 Maritime Safety Services Command
 Capul Light on Amateur Radio Lighthouse Society's World List of Lights

Lighthouses completed in 1896
Lighthouses in the Philippines
Buildings and structures in Northern Samar
Spanish colonial infrastructure in the Philippines